Joanna Werners (born 25 December 1953) is a Dutch writer of Surinamese origin. She is considered a pioneer of Surinamese lesbian literature.

Biography 
Werners was born on 25 December 1953 in Paramaribo, Suriname. She attended the city's Algemene Middelbare School. At age 18, she moved to the Netherlands, where she worked as a physical education and economics teacher.

Her debut book was the autobiographical novel Droomhuid, released in 1987. The book tells the story of a woman who is torn between her love for a black man and a white woman. The novel is considered the first work of lesbian-feminist literature in the history of Suriname.

Droomhuid was followed by the novels Vriendinnenvrouwen (1994), Amba, vrouw van het Surinaamse erf (1996), Zuigend moeras (1990), and Schaamteloze warmte (2002), all of which deal with black women, their social and psychological emancipation, and lesbianism. Her work has also dealt with such issues as unwanted pregnancy and old age. In 2007, Werners released her poetry collection Sluimerende schaduwen as part of the poetry series De Windroos.

Selected works 

 Droomhuid (1987) 
 Zuigend moeras (1990) 
 Vriendinnenvrouwen (1994) 
 Amba, vrouw van het Surinaamse erf (1996) 
 Amba, je was toch allemaal vrouw (1996) 
 Schaamteloze warmte (2002) 
 Sluimerende Schaduwen (2007)

References

External links 
 Joanna Werner at the Digital Library for Dutch Literature (in Dutch)

Surinamese women writers
Surinamese poets
Surinamese women poets
Dutch women writers
Dutch women poets
Lesbian writers
Afro-Caribbean culture
People from Paramaribo
Surinamese emigrants to the Netherlands
Living people
1953 births